Phyllostylon is a genus of plant in family Ulmaceae.

Species include:
 Phyllostylon brasiliense Capan. ex Benth. & Hook.f.
 Phyllostylon orthopterum Hallier f.
 Phyllostylon rhamnoides (J.Poiss.) Taub.

 
Taxonomy articles created by Polbot
Rosales genera